The "Graduate Business Forum" (GBF) is a United States based non-profit foundation, best known for its annual global Graduate Business Conference. The conference brings together top business leaders, political leaders, governments and selected students from the top 55 MBA Business Schools in the world to exchange the ideas about best practices on "Student-Government Corporate Social Responsibility (CSR)", "Community Services" and to discuss the "Most Challenging Issues" facing the world from the perspective of a responsible leadership . The Forum also organizes a series of regional meetings throughout the year.

The Graduate Business Forum was founded in 1983 by Jim Deveau, a then MBA student and President of the student government at Columbia Business School. Beyond conferences, the Forum produces articles on ethical and responsible leadership of the MBA community and engages its members in business schools or community initiatives.

Organization 
The Forum is headquartered in Fairfield, Connecticut, United States. It is impartial and not-for-profit and is not tied to any political, partisan or national interest. Its highest governance body is the Board of Directors consisting of business, academic and previous student government leaders from multiple locations worldwide.

Membership
The GBF is a community where leadership is put into action, where best practices are shared, and where globalism is embraced by all its members.

Individual GBF Membership is restricted to elected Student Leaders of the Student Government Bodies of the top 55 MBA Business Schools in the world.  Student Leaders are invited upon election to participate in the global activities, events, and network of the Graduate Business Forum.

Business schools that have participated in the GBF and GBC:
 Australian Graduate School of Management, Sydney
 Carnegie Mellon University, Tepper
 Case Western University, Weatherhead
 China Europe International Business School (CEIBS)
 Chinese University of Hong Kong
 Columbia Business School
 Cornell University, Johnson
 Copenhagen Business School
 Dartmouth College, Tuck
 Duke University, Fuqua
 Emory University, Goizueta
 ESADE Business School
 ESCP Business School
 Georgetown, McDonough
 Harvard Business School
 HEC Montreal
 HEC Paris	
 Hong Kong University of Science and Technology
 IE Business School
 IESE Business School
 IMD Business School
 Indian Institute of Management - Ahmedabad
 Indian School of Business
 Indiana University, Kelley
 INSEAD	
 International University of Japan
 London Business School
 London School of Economics
 Manchester Business School
 MIT Sloan School of Management
 McGill University
 Melbourne Business School
 Michigan State University, Broad
 Nanyang Technological University
 National Chengchi University
 National University of Singapore
 New York University, Stern	
 Northwestern University, Kellogg
 Norwegian School of Economics
 Notre Dame University, Mendoza
 Purdue University, Krannert
 Queens School of Business
 RSM Erasmus University
 Stanford Graduate School of Business
 Stockholm School of Economics
 Tsinghua University
 University of California–Berkeley, Haas
 University of California–Los Angeles, Anderson
 University of Cambridge
 University of Chicago, Booth
 University of Cologne
 University of Economics, Prague
 University of Illinois at Urbana-Champaign
 University of Maryland, Smith
 University of Michigan, Ross
 University of North Carolina–Chapel Hill, Kenan-Flagler
 University of Oxford
 University of Pennsylvania, Wharton
 University of Rochester, Simon
 University of Southern California, Marshall
 University of Texas at Austin, McCombs
 University of Virginia, Darden
 University of Washington, The Michael G. Foster School of Business
 University of Western Ontario, Ivey
 University St. Gallen
 Washington University in St. Louis, Olin Business School
 Wits (Johannesburg)
 Yale University, SOM
 York University, Schulich

Graduate Business Conference
The Graduate Business Forum's best-known activity is the annual global Graduate Business Conference, which brings together business and political leaders with selected student government leaders from the top 50 MBA Business Schools in the world. They exchange best practices, network, and debate the most pressing issues facing education and the economy from a responsible leadership perspective. The Forum also organizes a series of regional meetings throughout the year.

The Graduate Business Conference has been held since 1983:

YEAR, 	HOST UNIVERSITY, 	                        GBC THEME
 2019, 	ESCP Paris, 	France: United in Diversity
2018, 	Copenhagen Business School, 	The Nordic Way in a Global Context
2017, 	The Chinese University of Hong Kong, 	Business 4 Good: The Ultimate Challenge!

2016, 	University of St. Gallen, Switzerland, 	Giving Back: The Responsibility of Future Leaders
 2015, 	China Europe International Business School (CEIBS), Shanghai, 	The New Normal: China and the World
 2014,	No conference was held
 2013,	Indian School of Business, Hyderabad
 2012, William E. Simon Graduate School of Business - Rochester, New York, Size Matters
 2011,	ESADE,					Responsible Leadership
 2010,	University of Maryland (Smith),		Post Crisis: Business Leadership in the New Global Economy
 2009,	National Chengchi University, Taipei,	Accessing the Market of Greater China
 2008,	UC Berkeley (Haas),			The Global Leader and the Leader Within
 2007,	National University of Singapore,	The Silk Route
 2006,	Copenhagen Business School,	Discovering Potential
 2005,	Indiana University (Kelley),		Creating Value through Leadership
 2004,	University of Michigan (Ross),		Leading in Dynamic Times
 2003,	University of Virginia (Darden),		Innovate!
 2002,	Emory University (Goizueta),		Getting to the Future First
 2001,	Cornell University (Johnson),		Leading on the Edge
 2000,	UCLA (Anderson),	        The Net Effect
 1999,	University of Texas (McCombs),		Driving Technological Change
 1998,	Washington University (Olin),		Business in the Community
 1997,	Vanderbilt University (Owen),		Managing Quality: Quality Managing
 1996,	UC Berkeley (Haas)	,		Entrepreneurship
 1995,	University of Western Ontario (Ivey),	Global Competitiveness: What Does it Take?
 1994,	Case Western University (Weatherhead),	The Changing Face of American Industry
 1993,	New York University (Stern)	,	Corporate Social Responsibility
 1992,	Indiana University (Kelley)	,	Business and the Environment
 1991,	University of Michigan (Ross)	,	1992 and the EEC
 1990,	University of Washington (Foster),	Pacific Rim Countries
 1989,	University of Virginia (Darden)	,	Business Ethics and Ideals
 1988,	Northwestern University (Kellogg),	The Services Industry
 1987,	University of Texas (McCombs)	,	Innovation for Entrepreneurial Success
 1986,	University of Pennsylvania (Wharton),	The Increasingly International Nature of Business
 1985,	Duke University (Fuqua)	,		MBA's in the Information Age
 1984,	UCLA (Anderson)		,	        The Bottom Line of Leadership
 1983,	Columbia University	,		The MBA - A Student Perspective

Global Student Leadership Award
The Student Leadership Award was inaugurated in 1991 by the board of directors of the Graduate Business Forum (GBF) to recognize leadership, innovation, and a commitment to the greater community at the graduate business level. In the past, influential leaders, such as CEOs, prime ministers, presidents, and royalty have bestowed this award upon a student or team during a commemorative banquet at the annual Graduate Business Conference.

Dave Chonowski and Chris Petersen, 2009 awardees from the University of Illinois at Urbana-Champaign, turned their winning idea into the MBA Veterans Network, a global community of military veteran students and alumni of the world's leading business schools. Their organization has generated significant interest from the business media and has since been featured in both BusinessWeek and the Wall Street Journal. 
 
Member schools may execute up to two nominations for their institution.

See also
 Global Leader of Tomorrow

References

Reference books 
 Barbara Kellerman, Reinventing Leadership: Making the Connection Between Politics and Business, Published by SUNY Press, 1999, 268 pages.
 David Bornstein, How to Change the World: Social Entrepreneurs and the Power of New Ideas, Published by Oxford University Press US, 2007, 358 pages.
 David Rothkopf, Superclass: The global power elite and the world they are making, Published by Farrar, Straus and Giroux, 2008, 400 pages
 Mike Moore, A World Without Walls: Freedom, Development, Free Trade and Global Governance, Published by Cambridge University Press, 2003, 292 pages.

External links 
 Graduate Business Forum Homepage

Foundations based in the United States
Business conferences
Organizations established in 1983